The Women's sprint cross-country skiing competition at the 2006 Winter Olympics in Turin, Italy was held on 22 February, at Pragelato.

Emilie Öhrstig was the defending World Champion, but she won in the classical style, and the last free style sprint in the World Championships (in 2003) was won by Marit Bjørgen. Yuliya Chepalova is defending Olympic champion. The most recent freestyle sprint event in the World Cup, however, was won by the Russian Alyona Sidko at 30 December 2005.

Results

Qualifying
Sixty-six skiers completed the 1.1 kilometre course in the qualifying portion of the event, with the top thirty advancing to the quarterfinals.

Quarterfinals

There were five quarterfinal races, each with six skiers. The top two in each heat advanced to the semifinals.

Quarterfinal 1

Quarterfinal 2

Quarterfinal 3

Quarterfinal 4

Quarterfinal 5

Semifinals

There were two semifinal races, each with five skiers. The top two in each semifinal advanced to the A Final, to compete for the top four places, while the third and fourth-placed finishers advanced to the B Final, for places five through eight.

Semifinal 1

Semifinal 2

Finals

Chandra Crawford finished 0.7 seconds ahead of Claudia Künzel to win the Olympic gold medal in the women's cross-country sprint.

Final A

Final B

References

Women's cross-country skiing at the 2006 Winter Olympics
Women's individual sprint cross-country skiing at the Winter Olympics